Wagoner was a community, now extinct, in Allen Township, Miami County, in the U.S. state of Indiana.

History
Wagoner was named for a small railroad station. In 1887, the community contained a steam saw mill and a general store.

A post office was established at Wagoner in 1872, and remained in operation until 1921. J. F. Wagoner served as the original postmaster.

Geography

References

Geography of Miami County, Indiana
Ghost towns in Indiana